The Rufus Buck Gang was an outlaw Native American gang whose members were Creek Indian and African American.  Their crime spree took place in the Indian Territory of the Arkansas-Oklahoma area from July 30 1895 through August 4 of 1896.

Formed by Rufus Buck, the gang consisted also of Lewis Davis, Sam Sampson, Maoma July, and Lucky Davis. The gang began building up a small stockpile of weapons while staying in Okmulgee, Oklahoma. After killing U.S. deputy marshal John Garrett on July 30, 1895, the gang began holding up various stores and ranches in the Fort Smith area during the next two weeks. In one incident, a salesman named Callahan – after being robbed – was offered a chance to escape if he could outrun the gang. When the elderly Callahan successfully escaped, the gang killed his assistant in frustration. 
At least two female victims who were raped by the gang died of their injuries.

List of crimes committed by the gang
July 30, 1895: Killing of US Deputy Marshal John Garrett
July 31, 1895: Coming across a white man and his daughter in a wagon, the gang held the man at gunpoint and took the girl.
They killed a black boy and beat Ben Callahan until they mistakenly believed he was dead, then took Callahan's boots, money, and saddle.
Robbing of country stores of West and J. Norrberg at Orket, Oklahoma
Murder of two white women and a 14-year-old girl
August 4: Rape of a Mrs Hassen near Sapulpa, Oklahoma. Hassen and two of three other female victims of the gang—a Miss Ayres and an Indian girl near Sapulpa—also died; a fourth victim, Mrs Wilson, was reported to have recovered; it is reported that, after their capture, the gang was almost lynched

Capture and hanging of the gang
Continuing attacks on both local settlers and Creek indiscriminately, the gang was captured outside Muskogee by a combined force of lawmen and Indian police of the Creek Light Horse, led by Marshal S. Morton Rutherford, on August 10. While the Creek wanted to hold the gang for trial, the men were brought before "Hanging" Judge Isaac Parker.  He twice sentenced them to death, the first sentence not being carried out pending an ultimately unsuccessful appeal to the Supreme Court. They were hanged on July 1, 1896 at 1 pm at Fort Smith.

Depiction in culture
A slightly modified account of the gang's crimes is the basis for the novel Winding Stair by Douglas C. Jones.

The Buck gang, "Hanging Judge" Isaac Parker, half-black, half-Indian outlaw Cherokee Bill, and the socio-political environment at the death of Indian Territory are the subjects of the 2011 historical novel I Dreamt I Was in Heaven - The Rampage of the Rufus Buck Gang by Leonce Gaiter.

The story of the gang served as an inspiration for the 2021 Western film The Harder They Fall, in which Rufus Buck was portrayed by Idris Elba. The gang was also featured in the 2019 film Hell on the Border.

See also
Brooks-McFarland Feud

References

External links
 Encyclopedia of Oklahoma History and Culture - Buck Gang 
 Annual report of the Department of the Interior, Volume 2 1896 .p.158
 http://www.jcs-group.com/oldwest/outlaws/rufus.html

Outlaw gangs in the United States
Outlaws of the American Old West
Gangs in Arkansas
Gangs in Oklahoma
Muscogee culture